In mathematics, the generalized taxicab number Taxicab(k, j, n) is the smallest number — if it exists — that can be expressed as the sum of j kth positive powers in n different ways. For k = 3 and j = 2, they coincide with taxicab numbers.

 — famously stated by Ramanujan.

Euler showed that

However, Taxicab(5, 2, n) is not known for any n ≥ 2:No positive integer is known that can be written as the sum of two 5th powers in more than one way, and it is not known whether such a number exists.

The largest variable of  must be at least 3450.

See also
Cabtaxi number

References

External links
Generalised Taxicab Numbers and Cabtaxi Numbers
Taxicab Numbers - 4th powers
Taxicab numbers by Walter Schneider

Number theory

de:Taxicab-Zahl#Verallgemeinerte Taxicab-Zahl